Flowing Kiss is an art installation consisting of two 2013 stainless steel sculptures by Lawrence Argent, installed at North Bank Park in Columbus, Ohio, United States. According to The Sculpture Center's Outdoor Sculpture Inventory, the sculptures face one another, and "both are wide, rippling shape that narrows to lips ready for a kiss". They were installed in 2013.

See also

 2013 in art

References

External links
 Flowing Kiss at Lawrence Argent's website
 Flowing Kiss at the City of Columbus

2013 establishments in Ohio
2013 sculptures
Outdoor sculptures in Columbus, Ohio
Stainless steel sculptures in the United States
Steel sculptures in Ohio